Sugar Jones was a Canadian all-female pop group created on the first season of the Canadian version of Popstars in 2001. It consisted of five members chosen from thousands of contestants who auditioned all over Canada in hopes of gaining a spot in the group. In 2001, they released their debut and only album, which was self-titled, in the summer of 2001, that featured the singles "Days Like That" (a cover of the Fierce song) and "How Much Longer", both gaining fair amount of airplay on Canadian Radio throughout 2001. Sugar Jones studio album was recorded at Metalworks Studios in Mississauga, Ontario. After mostly local Canadian success, the band disbanded the following year, in the Spring of 2002.

After disbanding
After disbanding, each member pursued various interests, with Julie and Andrea both releasing solo albums in 2008. 

Julie has since married and has 2 children, as well as shifted careers to interior design and home renovation, starting a home renovation company with her husband. 

Andrea continues to work in music as an administrator in arts & event services.

Sahara MacDonald released an album independently and starred in several theatre productions, including Toronto's production of We Will Rock You. 
She is now a yoga instructor. 

Maiko Watson released her solo album, Sweet Vibration, in 2009, which received Best Urban Album at the 2010 Western Canadian Music Awards. In 2021, she was featured on the CBC series Murdoch Mysteries as Mary Suddon. She married in 2018, is now known as Maiko Munroe and also in the profession of Real Estate.

Mirella became a teacher at West Island College in her hometown of Montreal and is married to Anthony De Luca, with whom she has two sons. She is still somewhat active in music, mostly live performance, and has worked in the hotel industry. She is now a secretary on the school board in Quebec.

Members
Sahara MacDonald (b. Jun. 19, 1977)
Andrea Henry (b. Dec. 14, 1978)
Julie Crochetière (b. Jul. 10, 1980)
Maiko Watson (b. Apr. 29, 1981)
Mirella Dell'Aquila (b. Nov. 26, 1981)

Discography

Studio albums

Singles

References

External links
Julie Crochetière Official site
Julie Crochetière Official Myspace
Andrea Henry Official Myspace
Sahara MacDonald Official Myspace
Maiko Watson Official site

Canadian pop music groups
Canadian contemporary R&B musical groups
Canadian girl groups
Musical groups established in 2001
Musical groups disestablished in 2002
Popstars winners